

Organizations
A press club is an organization for journalists and others professionally engaged in the production and dissemination of news.  A press club whose membership is defined by the press of a given country may be known as a National Press Club of that country. Examples include:
Press Club of India (New Delhi)
National Press Club (Australia)
Concordia Press Club (Austria), the oldest of its type in the world
National Press Club of Canada
Press Club de France
Press Club, Thiruvananthapuram (India)
Japan National Press Club
National Press Club (Pakistan)
National Press Club (Philippines)
Press Club Polska (Poland)
National Press Club (South Africa)
Birmingham Press Club (UK)
London Press Club (UK)
National Press Club (United States)
Press Club (San Francisco)
National Press Club (Bangladesh)
National Broadcasting Corporation National Press Club (Papua New Guinea)

Music
Press Club (band), an Australian punk band

See also
International Association of Press Clubs

References

External links